Azima tetracantha (syn. Monetia barlerioides L'Her.)  is an ornamental plant in the Salvadoraceae family. Common Name: Bee Sting Bush. This plant is commonly known as 'Yashankala' in ayurveda. Its foliage is an important medicine for post-pregnancy treatments, the same is also used for 'karkidaka treatments' which is famous in Kerala.

References
 
https://web.archive.org/web/20110726174708/http://indjst.org/archive/vol.3.issue.2/feb10thendral-15.pdf
http://florawww.eeb.uconn.edu/199900270.html

External links

Salvadoraceae
Taxa named by Jean-Baptiste Lamarck
Albany thickets